Zooper Doopers are a brand of flavoured frozen ice pole product, from Australia. They generally come in a plastic tube packaging as a liquid. They are then frozen at home in the household freezer. Zooper Doopers are somewhat of a cultural icon and have been popular since they first appeared in 1971. They are produced by the Bega Dairy & Drinks, division of the  Bega Cheese company.

They are a traditional hot weather treat in Australia.

Flavours

Zooper Doopers come in 8 different flavours, raspberry, fairy floss, cola, blackcurrant, orange, pineapple, lime and bubblegum. Once frozen, the top of the plastic tube can be cut, exposing the frozen product within which can then be eaten from the tube. A sugar-free line was also introduced in 2019, which comes in six different flavours - cola, raspberry, blackcurrant, blue lemonade, tropical, and marshmallow.

Limited edition
In October 1996, National Foods Beverages Group introduced two new flavours, bubblegum and honeycomb, as well as a Zooper Dooper Joystick. The Joystick was a 150ml extended version of the original Zooper Dooper, as opposed to the original 70ml variety. 

There are also limited edition sour and magic varieties. Zooper Dooper Sourz come in watermelon, blackcurrant, apple, lemon, raspberry, and grape flavours, while the magic variety comes in lemonade, red creamy soda, banana candy, toffee apple, grape bubblegum, orange sherbert, strawberries & cream, and jaffa. 

Store exclusive 'Your Zooper Dooper Favorites' bags were also available for a limited time in two varieties, each containing only two flavours from the standard lineup. Fairy floss and blackcurrant bags were only available at Coles and lime and cola bags were only available at Woolworths. Limited edition single-flavour packs have also been released.

Derivative products 
In 2021, Bega released a limited edition range of Zooper Dooper milk, available in pineapple, bubblegum, and raspberry flavours. In 2022, fairy floss and cola spider flavours were released.

References

External links 
 

Australian confectionery
Ice-based desserts
Snack foods